

List inclusion
 All acts are listed alphabetically.
 Solo artists are alphabetized by last name (unless they use only their first name, e.g. Alizée, listed under A), Groups by group name excluding "A," "An", "The" (in English), "Le", "La" and "Les" (in French).
 Featurings are also listed if they appear on the cover of the single.
 All artists are listed separately, unless their names are inextricably linked (e.g. MC Miker G & DJ Sven).

0–9

A

B

C

D

E

F

G

H

I

J

K

L

M

N

O

P

R

S

T

U

V

W

Y

Z

1 Appears on the single cover as "featuring"
2 Credited as Vitoo

See also 
List of number-one hits (France)
Syndicat National de l'Édition Phonographique

Sources
 Title Snep Chart Main Page 
 Syndicat National de l'Édition Phonographique, official site (provides number-ones from June 2000)
 

France
French record charts
French music-related lists